The history of Hawaii describes the era of human settlements in the Hawaiian Islands.  The islands were first settled by Polynesians sometime between 124 and 1120 AD. Hawaiian civilization was isolated from the rest of the world for at least 500 years.  

An expedition led by British explorer James Cook is usually considered to be the first group of Europeans to arrive in the Hawaiian Islands, which they did in 1778. However, Spanish historians and some other researchers state that the Spanish captain Ruy López de Villalobos was the first European to see the islands in 1542. The Spanish named these islands "Isla de Mesa, de los Monjes y Desgraciada" (1542), being on the route linking the Philippines with Mexico across the Pacific Ocean, between the ports of Acapulco and Manila, which were both part of New Spain.  Within five years after Cook's arrival, European military technology helped Kamehameha I, ruler of the island of Hawaii, conquer and unify the islands for the first time, establishing the Kingdom of Hawaii in 1795.  The kingdom was prosperous and important for its agriculture and strategic location in the Pacific.

American immigration, led by Protestant missionaries, and Native Hawaiian outmigration, mostly on whaling ships, began almost immediately after Cook's arrival. Americans set up plantations to grow sugar. Their methods of plantation farming required substantial labor. Waves of permanent immigrants came from Japan, China, and the Philippines to work in the fields. The government of Japan organized and gave special protection to its people, who comprised about 25 percent of the Hawaiian population by 1896.  The Hawaiian monarchy encouraged this multi-ethnic society, initially establishing a constitutional monarchy in 1840 that promised equal voting rights regardless of race, gender, or wealth. 

The population of Native Hawaiians in Hawaii declined from an unknown number prior to 1778 (commonly estimated to be around 300,000), to around 142,000 in the 1820s based on the first census conducted by American missionaries, 82,203 in the 1850 Hawaiian Kingdom census, 40,622 in the last Hawaiian Kingdom census of 1890, 39,504 in the only census by the Republic of Hawaii in 1896, and 37,656 in the first census conducted by the United States in 1900 after the annexation of Hawaii to the United States in 1898.  Since Hawaii has joined the United States the Native Hawaiian population in Hawaii has increased with every census to 289,970 in 2010.

Americans within the kingdom government rewrote the constitution, severely curtailing the power of King "David" Kalākaua, and disenfranchising the rights of most Native Hawaiians and Asian citizens to vote, through excessively high property and income requirements. This gave a sizeable advantage to plantation owners. Queen Liliʻuokalani attempted to restore royal powers in 1893 but was placed under house arrest by businessmen with help from the United States military. Against the Queen's wishes, the Republic of Hawaii was formed for a short time. This government agreed on behalf of Hawaii to join the United States in 1898 as the Territory of Hawaii. In 1959, the islands became the state of Hawaii.

Ancient Hawaii

Discovery and settlement

The date of the first settlements of the Hawaiian Islands is a topic of continuing debate. Patrick Vinton Kirch's books on Hawaiian archeology, standard textbooks, date the first Polynesian settlements to about 300, with more recent suggestions by Kirch as late as 600. Other theories suggest dates as late as 700 to 800. The most recent survey of carbon-dating evidence puts the arrival of the first settlers at around A.D. 940–1130.

The history of the ancient Polynesians was passed down through genealogy chants that were recited at formal and family functions. The genealogy of the high chiefs could be traced back to the period believed to be inhabited only by gods. The pua aliʻi ("flower of royalty") were considered to be living gods.

By about 1000, settlements founded along the perimeters of the islands were beginning to cultivate food in gardens.

A Tahitian priest named Pā‘ao is said to have brought a new order to the islands around 1200. The new order included new laws and a new social structure that separated the people into classes. The aliʻi nui was the king, with his ʻaha kuhina just below them. The aliʻi were the royal nobles with the kahuna (high priest) below them, the makaʻāinana (commoners) next with the kauā below them as the lowest ranking social caste.

The rulers of the Hawaiian islands (noho aliʻi o ko Hawaiʻi Pae ʻAina) are a line of Native Hawaiians who were independent rulers of various subdivisions of the islands of Hawaii. Their genealogy is traced to Hānalaʻanui and others. The aliʻi nui were responsible for making sure the people observed a strict kapu (a code of conduct relating to taboos). The system had rules regarding many aspects of Hawaiian social order, fishing rights and even where women could eat. After the death of Kamehameha I, the system was abolished, and the Hawaiian religion soon fell as the gods were abandoned.

By 1500 Hawaiians began to spread to the interiors of the islands and religion was more emphasized.

Prior to conquest by Kamehameha I, the islands did not have a single name, as each island was ruled as separate kingdoms known only by the island names.  The first recorded names of the island by Captain Cook reflect this fact.  Kamehameha I, as ruler of the island of Hawaii, imposed the name "Hawaii" on the islands.

Religion

There were atheists, known as 'aia, in Hawaii.  However, the dominant religion in Hawaii, similar to many other Polynesian societies, was the kapu or taboo religion, which has a theology, ritual and a code of conduct. There are many gods and heroes with many different people worshiping different gods in different ways.  In one tradition, Wākea, the Sky Father, wed Papahānaumoku, the Earth Mother. From their union came all others, including the other gods.  In another traditional genealogy named Pu-anue, Kumukumu-ke-kaa and her husband Paia-a-ka-lani were the mother and father of the earth and heavens.  Another genealogy declares that Ka-mai-eli and Kumu-honua were the mother and father.    

The kapu religion in Hawaii was polytheistic, with four deities most prominent: Kāne, Kū, Lono and Kanaloa. Other notable deities include Laka, Kihawahine, Haumea, Papahānaumoku, and, most famously, Pele. In addition, each family is considered to have one or more guardian spirits or family gods known as ʻaumakua to protect them. One such god is Iolani, the god of alii families.

One breakdown of the Kapu pantheon in Hawaii consists of the following groups:
 four major gods (ka hā) – Kū, Kāne, Lono, Kanaloa
 forty male gods or aspects of Kāne (ke kanahā)
 four hundred gods and goddesses (ka lau)
 a multitude of gods and goddesses (ke kini akua)
 spirits (na unihipili)
 guardians (na aumākua)
Another breakdown consists of three major groups:
 four gods, or akua: Kū, Kāne, Lono, Kanaloa
 many lesser gods, or kupua, each associated with certain professions
 guardian spirits, aumakua, associated with particular families

Liloa, Hākau and ʻUmi a Līloa

 Liloa 
Līloa was a legendary ruler of the island of Hawaii in the late 15th century. His royal compound was in Waipiʻo Valley. His line is traced to Hawaiian "creation".

Līloa had two sons; his firstborn Hākau from his wife Pinea, (his mother's sister), and his second son, ʻUmi a Līloa from his lesser ranking wife, Akahi a Kuleana. Upon his death,  elevated Hākau as ruler and delegated religious authority to ʻUmi. Akahi a Kuleana was of a lesser line of chiefs who Liloa had fallen in love with when he discovered her bathing in a river. The couple met when Liloa was visiting Hamakua. He claimed his right to her as King and she accepted.

Liloa's Kāʻei is his sacred feathered sash, now kept at the Bishop Museum.[|]

Līloa was the first born son of Kiha nui lulu moku, one of the noho aliʻi (ruling elite). He descended from Hāna laʻa nui. Līloa's mother, Waioloa, his grandmother, Neʻula and great grandmother, Laʻa kapu were of the ʻEwa aliʻi lines of Oahu. Liloa's father ruled Hawaii as aliʻi nui and upon his death elevated Līloa. Kiha had had four other sons, Kaunuamoa, Makaoku, Kepailiula and Hoolana, whose descendants are the Kaiakea family of Molokai, distant relatives of Abraham Fornander's daughter.

In his book, David Malo described how Liloa originated the practice of moe āikane, the sexual relationship between males. The relationships had no social stigma and were accepted practice beginning with the alii and then copied by the other classes. Warriors engaged in the practice. The relationships cannot be defined as bisexuality. In many cases, the men involved felt it an honor and responsibility to honor their hana lawelawe.

 Hākau 
Just before his death, Liloa bestowed on Hākau the succession as Chief, telling Umi that he was to serve as his "man" (Prime Minister) and that both were to respect the other and should either have issue with the other it would be for them to decide. At first a decent king, Hākau soon became brutal. To avoid his brother's anger, 'Umi exiled himself to another district.

Hākau refused to help Nunu and Ka-hohe, his father's two favorite, ailing Kahuna who had requested food. This was considered highly insulting. The two were of the priestly class of the god Lono. They resented their treatment and plotted to see the kingdom in someone else's hand. Hākau did not believe the priests to have any power and disrespected them as 'Umi was the spiritual authority This was a period in when no King could defy a Kahuna. Many had a royal bloodline, land and could leave their temples as warriors when needed, but could never relinquish their spiritual responsibilities. Through a messenger of Kaoleioku, of Waipunalei, the high-priest of the temple of Manini, at Koholalele the two priests contacted Umi's court. The two priests traveled to Waipunalei where they supported Umi's revolt.

When Hākau received news that his brother was preparing to war against him, he sent his main forces out to immediately prepare by seeking feathers to adorn their war regalia. After the warriors had left and Hākau was undefended, Umi's warriors came forward with a deception that they were there with bundles of offerings for the king. When the bundles were dropped to the ground they were filled with rocks they used to stone Hākau to death.

 ʻUmi-a-Līloa 
ʻUmi-a-Līloa was a ruling aliʻi ai moku (district high chief of Hawai'i). He became chief after the death of his half brother Hākau and was considered a just ruler, religious and the first to unite almost all of the Big Island. The legend of ʻUmi-a-Līloa is one of the most popular hero sagas in Hawaiian history.

ʻUmi's wife was Princess Piʻikea, daughter of Piʻilani. They had one son, Kumalae and one daughter, Aihākōkō.

Liloa told Akahi that, if she were to have a male child, she should present the boy to him along with royal tokens he gave her as gifts, to prove her boy was the son of the king. Akahi hid the tokens from her husband and later gave birth to a son. At the age of 15 or 16, his stepfather was punishing the boy when his mother intervened and told the man not to touch him because the boy was his lord and chief. She uncovered the tokens to present to her husband to prove the high treason he would have committed. Akahi gave her son the royal malo and lei niho palaoa given to her by 'Umi's biological father. Only high chiefs wore these items. She sent 'Umi to Waipiʻo Valley to present himself to the king as his son.

Liloa's palace was guarded and attended by several Kahuna. The entire enclosure was sacred. Entering without permission carried the death penalty. Umi entered the enclosure with attendants afraid to stop someone wearing the royal insignia and walked straight to Liloa's sleeping quarters, waking him there. When Liloa asked who he was, he said "It is I, 'Umi your son". He then placed the tokens at his father's feet and Liloa proclaimed him to be his son. After learning of 'Umi, Hākau became upset. Liloa assured his first born that he would be king after his death and his brother would serve him. 'Umi was brought to court on an equal footing with Hākau. Living within Liloa's court alongside his brother, Umi found great favor from his father, increasing Hākau's dislike.

In exile, 'Umi took wives and began building forces and followers. Chiefs began to believe him to be of the highest chiefly nature from signs they observed. He gave food to people and became known for caring for all.

After Hākau's death the other aliʻi of the island claimed their districts for themselves. 'Umi took the advice of the two priests by marrying many woman of high noble rank, including his half sister Kapukini and the daughter of the ruler of Hilo, where he had been given sanctuary during Hākau's reign. Eventually Umi conquered the entire island.

After unifying the island of Hawaii, 'Umi was faithful to those who had supported him, and allowed his three most faithful companions, and the two Kahuna who had aided him, to help him govern.

AikāneAikāne relationships or (mostly male) homosexual or bisexual activity in the pre-colonial era was an accepted tradition. These relationships were accepted as part of ancient Hawaiian culture. Such sexual relationships may begin in the teens and continue thereafter, even though they have heterosexual partners. The Hawaiian aikāne relationship was a part of Hawaiian noble life, including that of Kamehameha I. Some myths refer to women's desires and therefore some women may have been involved in aikāne relationships as well.

Lieutenant James King stated that "all the chiefs had them" and recounts a tale that James Cook was actually asked by one chief to leave Lt. King behind, considering such offer a great honor. Members of Cook's crew related tales of the tradition with great disdain. American adventurer and sailor John Ledyard commented in detail about the tradition.

Land division system

Land was divided up in strict adherence to the wishes of the Ali‘i Nui. The traditional system of land has four hierarchical levels:mokupuni (island)moku (subdivisions of an island)ahupuaʻa (subdivision of moku)ʻili (two or three per ahupuaʻa, but Kahoolawe for example had eight)
Some oral history relates that ʻUmi a Līloa created the ahupuaʻa system. The system exploited the fact that communities were already organized along stream systems. The community governance system of Kānāwai is attributed specifically to shared water usage.

The Hawaiian agricultural system contained two major classes; irrigated and rain-fed (dryland) systems. Irrigated systems mainly supported taro (kalo) cultivation. Rain-fed systems were known as the mala. There they cultivated uala (sweet potatoes), yams, and dryland taro along with coconuts (niu), breadfruit (ʻulu), bananas (maiʻa) and sugarcane (ko). The kukui tree (Aleurites moluccanus) was sometimes used as a shade to protect the mala from the sun. Each crop was carefully placed in an area most suitable to its needs.

Hawaiians had domesticated dogs, chickens and pigs. They also grew personal gardens at home. Water was a very important part of Hawaiian life; it was used for fishing, bathing, drinking, and gardening, and for aquaculture systems in the rivers and at the shore's edge.

Ahupuaʻa most frequently consisted of a section of an island that went from the top of the local mountain to the shore, often following the boundary of a stream. Each ahupuaʻa included a lowland mala and upland forested region. Ahupuaʻa varied in size depending on the economic means of the location and political divisions of the area. "As the native Hawaiians used the resources within their ahupuaʻa, they practiced aloha (respect), laulima (cooperation) and malama (stewardship) which resulted in a desirable pono (balance)". The Hawaiians believed that the land, the sea, the clouds and all of nature had a certain interconnectedness which is why they used all of the resources around them to reach the desired balance in life. Sustainability was maintained by the konohiki and kahuna: priests, who restricted the fishing of certain species during specific seasons. They also regulated the gathering of plants.

The term "ahupuaʻa" is derived from the Hawaiian words ahu "heap, cairn" and puaʻa "pig". The boundary markers for ahupuaʻa were traditionally heaps of stones used to hold offers to the island chief, which was often a pig.

Each ahupuaʻa was divided into smaller sections called ʻili and the ʻili were divided into kuleana. These were individual plots of land that were cultivated by commoners who paid labor taxes to the land overseer each week. These taxes went to support the chief. Two possible reasons for this subdivision have been offered:
travel: in many areas of Hawaiʻi, it is easier to travel up- and downstream than from stream valley to stream valley.
economy: having all climate and economic exploitation zones in each land division ensured that each could be self-sufficient for a large portion of its needs.

Governance

The Kingdom was administered by an ali'i chief. Divisions were under the control of other smaller chiefs and managed by a steward. The headman of a land division or ahupua`a is a konohiki. Mokus were ruled by an aliʻi ʻaimoku. Ahupua'as were run by a headman or chief called a Konohiki.[|]

 Konohiki 

In Keelikolani vs Robinson, kononiki is defined as a Land Agent. In Territory vs Bishop Trust Co. LTD., when the agent was appointed by a chief, they were referred to as konohiki. The term could also be a designated area of land owned privately as compared to being owned by the government. A chief of lands retained life tenure on the land even after being discharged from the position, but a head man overseeing the same land had no such protection.

Often ali'i and konohiki are treated synonymously. However, while most konohiki were ali'i nobility, not all ali'i were konohiki. The Hawaiian dictionary defines konohiki as a headman of a land division, but also to describe fishing rights. Kono means to entice or prompt. Hiki refers to something that can be done. The konohiki was a relative of the ali'i and oversaw the property, managing water rights, land distribution, agricultural use and any maintenance. The konohiki also ensured that the right amounts of gifts and tribute were properly made at the right times.

As capitalism was incorporated into the kingdom, the konohiki became tax collectors, landlords and fishery wardens.

 Breaking of the Kapu 
In a triumph for women's equality, Hawaiians overthrew the kapu religious theocracy in 1819 by themselves, before the arrival of American missionaries and without the support of western powers like Great Britain, France, or the United States. On October 4, 1819, Kamehameha II, who became king after the death of his father Kamehameha I (the founder of the Hawaiian Kingdom), ate dinner with Queen Ka‘ahumanu, Kamehameha I’s favored wife, and Queen Keopuolani, the mother of Kamehameha II. The prohibition on men and women eating together, the ‘ai kapu, was one of the most ancient kapus or prohibitions: the penalty for its violation was death. Queen Ka‘ahumanu, however, despised the prohibition as it prevented her from entering certain religious temples where men made political decisions over meals.  Queen Keopuolani also violated the prohibition even before the public breaking.  Violating the ‘ai kapu at a public dinner, as Kamehameha II did, was a clear signal that the kapu system was abolished given Kamehameha II’s status as King, Kahamumanu’s status as Queen Regent, and Keopuolani’s status as Queen.  The guests at the dinner cried out “‘ai noa! ” (free eating). Afterwards, Kamehameha II – with the support of his high priest Hewahewa – ordered the destruction of the ancient heiau temples.  After the breaking of the kapu, a brief civil war then broke out, with Kamehameha I’s nephew, Kekuaokalani, opposing. Kekuaokalani’s forces were defeated by Kamehameha II’s at Kuamo‘o. The victory by Kamehameha II’s forces established, as a matter of Hawaiian political history, that no Hawaiian could impose kapu prohibitions on another ever again.

Contact

Captain James Cook (1728-1779) led three separate voyages (1768-1779) to chart unknown areas of the globe for Great Britain. On his third voyage he encountered Hawaii, first sighting the islands on 18 January 1778. He anchored off the coast of Kauai and met with the local inhabitants to trade and obtain water and food for his continued voyage. On 2 February 1778, Cook continued on to the coast of the North American continent, searching for a Northwest Passage for approximately nine months. He returned to the Hawaii chain to resupply, initially exploring the coasts of Maui and Hawaii Island to trade. He anchored in Kealakekua Bay in January 1779. After departing Kealakekua, he returned in February 1779 after a ship's mast broke in bad weather.

On the night of 13 February, while Cook's expedition lay anchored in the bay, Hawaiians stole one of his only two longboats (lifeboats used to ferry to/from ship/shore). In retaliation, Cook tried to kidnap the aliʻi nui of Hawaii Island, Kalaniʻōpuʻu. On 14 February 1779 Cook confronted an angry crowd. Kanaʻina approached Cook, who reacted by striking the royal attendant with the broad side of his sword. Kanaʻina picked up the navigator and dropped him while another attendant, Nuaa, killed Cook with a knife.

 Kingdom of Hawaii 
The Kingdom of Hawaii lasted from 1795 until its overthrow in 1893 with the fall of the House of Kalakaua.

House of Kamehameha

The House of Kamehameha (Hale O Kamehameha), or the Kamehameha dynasty, was the reigning Royal Family of the Kingdom of Hawaii, beginning with its founding by Kamehameha I in 1795 and ending with the deaths of Kamehameha V in 1872 and William Charles Lunalilo in 1874.

The origins of the House of Kamehameha can be traced to half brothers, Kalaniʻōpuʻu and Keōua. Kalaniʻōpuʻu's father was Kalaninuiʻīamamao while Keōua's father was Kalanikeʻeaumoku, both sons of Keaweʻīkekahialiʻiokamoku. They shared a common mother, Kamakaʻīmoku. Both brothers served Alapaʻinui, the ruling King of Hawaii Island. Hawaiian genealogy notes that Keōua may not have been Kamehameha's biological father, and that Kahekili II might have been his biological father. Regardless, Kamehameha I's descent from Keawe remains intact through his mother, Kekuʻiapoiwa II, a granddaughter of Keawe. Keōua acknowledged him as his son and this relationship is recognized by official genealogies.

The traditional mele chant of Keaka, wife of Alapainui, indicates that Kamehameha I was born in the month of ikuwā (winter) around November. Alapai gave the young Kamehameha to his wife Keaka and her sister Hākau to care for after the ruler discovered the boy had lived. Samuel Kamakau, wrote, "It was during the time of the warfare among the chiefs of [the island of] Hawaii which followed the death of Keawe, chief over the whole island (Ke-awe-i-kekahi-aliʻi-o-ka-moku) that Kamehameha I was born". However, his general dating was challenged. Abraham Fornander wrote, "when Kamehameha died in 1819 he was past eighty years old. His birth would thus fall between 1736 and 1740, probably nearer the former than the latter". William De Witt Alexander lists the birth date as 1736. He was first named Paiea but took the name Kamehameha, meaning "The very lonely one" or "The one set alone".

Kamehameha's uncle Kalaniʻōpuʻu raised him after Keōua's death. Kalaniʻōpuʻu ruled Hawaii as did his grandfather Keawe. He had advisors and priests. When word reached the ruler that chiefs were planning to murder the boy, he told Kamehameha:

After Kalaniʻōpuʻu's death, Kīwalaʻō took his father's place as first born and ruled the island while Kamehameha became the religious authority. Some chiefs supported Kamehameha and war soon broke out to overthrow Kīwalaʻō. After multiple battles the king was killed and envoys sent for the last two brothers to meet with Kamehameha. Keōua and Kaōleiokū arrived in separate canoes. Keōua came to shore first where a fight broke out and he and all aboard were killed. Before the same could happen to the second canoe, Kamehameha intervened. In 1793 Captain George Vancouver sailed from Britain and presented the Union Flag to Kamehameha, who was still in the process of uniting the islands into a single state; the Union Jack flew unofficially as the flag of Hawaii until 1816, including during a brief spell of British rule after Kamehameha ceded Hawaii to Vancouver in 1794.

By 1795, Kamehameha had conquered all but one of the main islands.  For his first royal residence, the new King built the first western-style structure in the Hawaiian Islands, known as the "Brick Palace". The location became the seat of government for the Hawaiian Kingdom until 1845. The king commissioned the structure to be built at Keawa'iki point in Lahaina, Maui. Two ex-convicts from Australia's Botany Bay penal colony built the home. It was begun in 1798 and was completed after 4 years in 1802. The house was intended for Kaʻahumanu, but she refused to live in the structure and resided instead in an adjacent, traditional Hawaiian-styled home.

Kamehameha I had many wives but held two in the highest regard. Keōpūolani was the highest ranking aliʻi of her time and mother to his sons, Liholiho and Kauikeaouli. Kaʻahumanu was his favorite. Kamehameha I died in 1819, succeeded by Liholiho.

Kamehameha II

After Kamehameha I's death, Liholiho left Kailua for a week and returned to be crowned king. At the lavish ceremony attended by commoners and nobles he approached the circle of chiefs, as Kaʻahumanu, the central figure in the group and Dowager Queen, said, "Hear me O Divine one, for I make known to you the will of your father. Behold these chiefs and the men of your father, and these your guns, and this your land, but you and I shall share the realm together". Liholiho agreed officially, which began a unique system of dual-government consisting of a King and co-ruler similar to a regent. Kamehameha II shared his rule with his stepmother, Kaʻahumanu. She defied Hawaiian kapu by dining with the young king, separating the sexes during meals, leading to the end of the Hawaiian religion. Kamehameha II died, along with his wife, Queen Kamāmalu in 1824 on a state visit to England, succumbing to measles. He was King for 5 years.

The couple's remains were returned to Hawaii by Boki. Aboard the ship The Blond his wife Liliha and Kekūanāoʻa were baptized as Christians. Kaʻahumanu also converted and became a powerful Christian influence on Hawaiian society until her death in 1832. Since the new king was only 12 years old, Kaʻahumanu was now senior ruler and named Boki as her Kuhina Nui.

Boki left Hawaii on a trip to find sandalwood to cover a debt and was lost at sea. His wife, Liliha took the governorship of Maui and unsuccessfully attempted to whip up a revolt against Kaʻahumanu, who upon Boki's departure, had installed Kīnaʻu as a co-governor.

Kaʻahumanu

Kaʻahumanu was born on Maui around 1777. Her parents were aliʻi of a lower-ranking line. She became Kamehameha's consort when she was fourteen. George Vancouver states: "[O]ne of the finest woman we had yet seen on any of the islands". To wed the young woman, Kamehameha had to consent to make her children his heirs to the Kingdom, although she had no issue.

Before his death, Kamehameha selected Kaʻahumanu to rule along with his son. Kaʻahumanu had also adopted the boy. She had the highest political clout in the islands. A portrait artist remarked of her: "This Old Dame is the most proud, unbending Lady in the whole island. As the widow of [Kamehameha], she possesses unbound authority and respect, not any of which she is inclined to lay aside on any occasion whatsoever". She was one of Hawaii's most influential leaders.

The Royal Election of 1874 and Sugar reciprocity

Sugar became a major export from Hawaii soon after Cook's arrival. The first permanent plantation began in Kauai in 1835. William Hooper leased 980 acres of land from Kamehameha III and began growing sugarcane. Within thirty years plantations operated on the four main islands. Sugar completely altered Hawaii's economy.

American influence in Hawaiian government began with U.S. plantation owners demanding a say in Kingdom politics. This was driven by missionary religion and sugar economics. Pressure from these plantation owners was  felt by the King and chiefs as demands for land tenure. After the brief 1843 takeover by the British, Kamehameha III responded to the demands with the Great Mahele, distributing the lands to all Hawaiians as advocated by missionaries including Gerrit P. Judd. Kamehameha III also tried to modernize Hawaii's legal system by replacing indigenous traditions with Anglo-American common law.

During the 1850s, the U.S. import tariff on sugar from Hawaii was much higher than the import tariffs Hawaiians were charging the U.S., and Kamehameha III sought reciprocity. The monarch wished to lower U.S. tariffs and make Hawaiian sugar competitive with other foreign suppliers. In 1854 Kamehameha III proposed a policy of reciprocity between the countries, but the proposal died in the U.S. Senate.

U.S. control of Hawaii was considered vital for the defense of its west coast. The military was especially interested in Pu'uloa, Pearl Harbor. The sale of one harbor was proposed by Charles Reed Bishop, a foreigner who had married into the Kamehameha family, had risen to be Hawaiian Minister of Foreign Affairs and owned a country home near Pu'uloa. He showed two U.S. officers around the lochs, although his wife, Bernice Pauahi Bishop, privately disapproved of selling Hawaiian lands. As monarch, William Charles Lunalilo, was content to let Bishop run most business affairs, but the ceding of lands became unpopular with Hawaiians. Many islanders thought that all the islands, rather than just Pearl Harbor, might be lost and opposed any cession. By November 1873, Lunalilo canceled negotiations but his health declined swiftly, and he died on February 3, 1874, at age of 39.

Lunalilo left no heirs. The legislature was empowered by the constitution to elect the monarch in these instances.  The legislature decided to hold a public referendum and to choose who the public voted for.  Queen Emma and David Kalākaua both declared their candidacy.  Kalākaua won the election.  However, Queen Emma and her supporters were not satisfied.  While the legislature was formally voting to certify Kalākaua as King pursuant to the public referendum, Queen Emma's supporters descended on the capitol and attacked the legislators.  13 legislators supporting Kalākaua were injured, including one who died after being tossed from a window.  The monarchy had no army and the police deserted, thus the Hawaiian government requested the support of American troops to quell the riot.  The legislature then duly elected Kalākaua as Lunalilo's successor. 

The new ruler was pressured by the U.S. government to surrender Pearl Harbor to the Navy. Kalākaua was concerned that this would lead to annexation by the U.S. and to violating the traditions of the Hawaiian people, who believed that the land ('Āina) was fertile, sacred and not for sale. From 1874 through 1875, Kalākaua made a state visit to Washington DC to gather support for a new treaty. Congress agreed to the Reciprocity Treaty of 1875 for seven years in exchange for Ford Island (Pearl Harbor). After the treaty, sugar production expanded from 12,000 acres to 125,000 acres in 1891. At the end of the seven-year term, the United States showed little interest in renewal.

Rebellion of 1887 and the Bayonet Constitution

On January 20, 1887, the United States began leasing Pearl Harbor. Shortly afterwards, a group of mostly non-Hawaiians calling themselves the Hawaiian Patriotic League began the Rebellion of 1887. They drafted their own constitution on July 6, 1887. The new constitution was written by Lorrin Thurston, the Hawaiian Minister of the Interior who used the Hawaiian militia to threaten Kalākaua. Kalākaua was forced to dismiss his cabinet ministers and sign a new constitution that greatly lessened his power. It would become known as the "Bayonet Constitution" due to the threat of force.

Grover Cleveland was president at the time, and his secretary of state Thomas F. Bayard sent written instructions to the American minister George W. Merrill that in the event of another revolution in Hawaii, it was a priority to protect American commerce, lives and property. Bayard specified, "the assistance of the officers of our Government vessels, if found necessary, will therefore be promptly afforded to promote the reign of law and respect for orderly government in Hawaii." In July 1889, there was a small scale rebellion, and Minister Merrill landed Marines to protect Americans; the State Department explicitly approved his action.  Merrill's replacement, minister John L. Stevens, read those official instructions, and followed them in his controversial actions of 1893.

Although Kalākaua's signature alone had no legal power, the new constitution allowed the monarch to appoint cabinet ministers, but stripped him of the power to dismiss them without approval from the Legislature. Eligibility to vote for the House of Nobles was altered, requiring that both candidates and voters own property valued three thousand dollars or more, or have an annual income of six hundred dollars or more. This disenfranchised two thirds of native Hawaiians and other ethnic groups who had previously been eligible to vote. This constitution benefited the foreign plantation owners. With the legislature now responsible for naturalizing aliens, Americans and Europeans could retain their home country citizenship and vote as citizens of the kingdom. Along with voting privileges, Americans could hold office and still retain their American citizenship, something not afforded in any other nation and even allowed Americans to vote without becoming naturalized. Asian immigrants were no longer able to acquire citizenship or vote.

Wilcox Rebellion of 1888

The Wilcox Rebellion of 1888 was a plot to overthrow King David Kalākaua and replace him with his sister in a coup d'état. This was in response to increased political tension between the legislature and the king under the 1887 constitution. Kalākaua's sister, Princess Liliuokalani and wife, Queen Kapiolani returned from Queen Victoria's Golden Jubilee immediately after news reached them in Great Britain.

Kalākaua's distant cousin, a native Hawaiian officer and veteran of the Italian military, Robert William Wilcox returned to Hawaii at about the same time as Liliuokalani in October 1887 when the funding for his study program stopped. Wilcox, Charles B. Wilson, Princess Liliuokalani, and Sam Nowlein plotted to overthrow King Kalākaua and replace him with Liliuokalani. 300 Hawaiian conspirators hid in Iolani Barracks and an alliance was formed with the Royal Guard, but the plot was accidentally discovered in January 1888, less than 48 hours before the revolt. No one was prosecuted, but Wilcox was exiled. On February 11, 1888, Wilcox left Hawaii for San Francisco, intending to return to Italy with his wife.

Princess Liliuokalani was offered the throne several times by the Missionary Party who had forced the Bayonet Constitution on her brother, but she believed she would become a powerless figurehead like her brother and rejected the offers. In January 1891, Kalākaua traveled to San Francisco for his health, staying at the Palace Hotel. He died there on January 20. She then ascended the throne. Queen Liliuokalani called her brother's reign "a golden age materially for Hawaii".

 Liliuokalani's attempt to re-write Constitution 

Liliuokalani assumed the throne in the middle of an economic crisis. The McKinley Act had crippled the Hawaiian sugar industry by removing the duties on sugar imports from other countries into the US, eliminating the previous Hawaiian advantage due to the Reciprocity Treaty of 1875. Many Hawaii businesses and citizens lost revenue; in response Liliuokalani proposed a lottery system to raise money for her government. Controversially, opium licensing was proposed. Her ministers and closest friends were all opposed to this plan; they unsuccessfully tried to dissuade her from pursuing these initiatives, both of which came to be used against her in the brewing constitutional crisis.

Liliuokalani's chief desire was to restore power to the monarch by abrogating the 1887 Bayonet Constitution and promulgating a new one. The 1893 Constitution would have extended suffrage by reducing some property requirements. It would have disenfranchised many non-citizen Europeans and Americans. The Queen toured several islands on horseback, talking to the people about her ideas and receiving overwhelming support, including a lengthy petition in support of a new constitution. However, when the Queen informed her cabinet of her plans, they withheld their support, uncomfortable with what they expected her opponent's likely response to be.

Liliuokalani's attempt to promulgate a new constitution on January 14, 1893, was the precipitating event leading to the overthrow of the Kingdom of Hawaii three days later. The conspirators' stated goals were to depose the queen, overthrow the monarchy, and seek Hawaii's annexation to the U.S. The conspirators were five American, one English and one German national.

Overthrow

The overthrow was led by Thurston, who was the grandson of American missionaries and derived his support primarily from the American and European business class and other supporters of the Reform Party of the Hawaiian Kingdom. Most of the leaders of the Committee of Safety that deposed the queen were American and European citizens who were Kingdom subjects. They included legislators, government officers and a Supreme Court Justice of the Hawaiian Kingdom.

On January 16, the Marshal of the Kingdom, Charles B. Wilson was tipped off by detectives of the planned coup. Wilson requested warrants to arrest the 13 Council members and put the Kingdom under martial law. Because the members had strong political ties with U.S. Government Minister John L. Stevens, the requests were repeatedly denied by Attorney General Arthur P. Peterson and the Queen's cabinet, fearing if approved, the arrests would escalate the situation. After a failed negotiation with Thurston, Wilson began to collect his troops for the confrontation. Wilson and Captain of the Royal Household Guard Samuel Nowlein rallied a force of 496 troops who were kept at hand to protect the Queen.

The overthrow began on January 17, 1893. A policeman was shot and wounded while trying to stop a wagon carrying weapons to the Honolulu Rifles, the paramilitary wing of the Committee of Safety. The Committee feared the shooting would bring government forces to rout the conspirators and stop the coup before it could begin. The Committee of Safety initiated the overthrow by organizing the Honolulu Rifles made of about 1,500 armed local (non-native) men. The Rifles garrisoned Ali'iolani Hale across the street from ʻIolani Palace and waited for the Queen's response.

As these events were unfolding, the Committee of Safety expressed concern for the safety and property of American residents in Honolulu.

United States military support 
The coup efforts were supported by U.S. Government Minister John L. Stevens. The coup left the queen under house arrest at Iolani Palace. The Kingdom briefly became the Republic of Hawaii, before annexation by the United States in 1898. Advised about supposed threats to non-combatant American lives and property by the Committee of Safety,
Stevens summoned a company of uniformed U.S. Marines from the USS Boston and two companies of U.S. sailors to take up positions at the U.S. Legation, Consulate and Arion Hall on the afternoon of January 16, 1893. 162 armed sailors and Marines aboard the USS Boston in Honolulu Harbor came ashore under orders of neutrality. The sailors and Marines did not enter the Palace grounds or take over any buildings, and never fired a shot, but their presence intimidated royalist defenders. Historian William Russ states, "the injunction to prevent fighting of any kind made it impossible for the monarchy to protect itself."

 United States territory 

 Annexation 

In March 1897, William McKinley, a Republican expansionist, succeeded Democrat Grover Cleveland as U.S. President. He prepared a treaty of annexation but it lacked the needed 2/3 majority in the Senate given Democratic opposition. A joint resolution, written by Democratic Congressman Francis G. Newlands to annex Hawaii passed both the House and Senate; it needed only majority support.  The U.S. Supreme Court gave tacit recognition to the legitimacy of this annexation in De Lima v. Bidwell, 182 U.S. 1, 196 (1901). The Spanish–American War had broken out and many leaders wanted control of Pearl Harbor to help the United States to become a Pacific power and protect the West Coast. Kalākaua was concerned over a possible United States seizure of the Hawaiian Islands and, in Kalākaua's 1881 world tour held a secret meeting with the Japanese Emperor to bring Hawaii under the protective aegis. He proposed to unite the two nations with an arranged marriage between his 5-year-old niece Princess Kaʻiulani and 13-year-old Prince Yamashina Sadamaro. His proposal was rejected by Japan because Japan was concerned that accepting this offer will worsen the diplomatic conflict between Japan and the United States. In 1897 Japan sent warships to Hawaii to oppose annexation. The possibility of invasion and annexation by Japan made the decision even more urgent, especially since the islands' fourth population was Japanese who were largely sympathetic to their country's goal in doing so.

McKinley signed the Newlands Resolution annexing Hawaii on July 7, 1898, creating the Territory of Hawaii. On 22 February 1900 the Hawaiian Organic Act established a territorial government. Annexation opponents held that this was illegal, claiming the Queen was the only legitimate ruler. McKinley appointed Sanford B. Dole as territorial governor. The territorial legislature convened for the first time on February 20, 1901. Hawaiians formed the Hawaiian Independent Party, under the leadership of Robert Wilcox, Hawaii's first congressional delegate.

 Plantations 

Sugarcane plantations in Hawaii expanded during the territorial period. Some companies diversified and came to dominate related industries including transportation, banking and real estate. Economic and political power was concentrated in what were known as the "Big Five".

A 1909 strike by Japanese farm workers led to a brief experiment importing Russian laborers, mostly from Siberia. False promises of land grants by a recruiter named A.W. Perelstrous resulted in strikes among the Russian workers as well. Experiencing many hardships including a measles outbreak, lack of ability to communicate with Hawaiians, and culture clashes, most Russians ended up moving to California, New York, or back to Russia (mostly after the 1917 Russian Revolution).

 World War II 

 Attack on Pearl Harbor 

Pearl Harbor was attacked on December 7, 1941, by the Imperial Japanese Navy, killing almost 2,500 people and sinking the main American battleship fleet. Fortuitously for the Americans, the four Pacific aircraft carriers were not in port and escaped damage. Hawaii was put under martial law until 1945. Unlike the West Coast of the United States in which 100,000 ethnic Japanese citizens were interned, the Japanese American population in Hawaii completely avoided such similar fate, though hundreds of pro-Japan leaders were arrested. Pearl Harbor was the U.S.' main forward base for the Pacific War. The Japanese tried to invade in summer 1942 but were defeated at the Battle of Midway. Hundreds of thousands of American soldiers, sailors, Marines, and airmen passed through on their way to the fighting.

Many Hawaii residents served in the 442nd Regimental Combat Team, a U.S. Army infantry regiment. The regiment was composed almost entirely of American soldiers of Japanese ancestry. The regiment fought primarily in Italy, southern France and Germany. The 442nd Regiment was the most decorated unit for its size and length of service in American history. Its 4,000 members had to be replaced nearly 2.5 times due to casualties. In total, about 14,000 Hawaiians served, earning 9,486 Purple Hearts. The unit was awarded eight Presidential Unit Citations (five in one month). Twenty-one of its members, including Hawaii U.S. Senator Daniel Inouye, were awarded Medals of Honor. Its motto was "Go for Broke".

 Democratic Party 

In 1954 a series of non-violent industry-wide strikes, protests and other civil disobedience transpired. In the territorial elections of 1954 the reign of the Hawaii Republican Party in the legislature came to an abrupt end, replaced by the Democratic Party of Hawaii. Democrats lobbied for statehood and held the governorship from 1962 to 2002. The events also unionized the labor force, hastening the plantations' decline.

 Statehood 

President Dwight D. Eisenhower signed the Hawaii Admission Act on March 18, 1959, which allowed for Hawaiian statehood. After a popular referendum in which over 93% voted in favor of statehood, Hawaii was admitted as the 50th state on August 21, 1959.

 Annexation legacy 

For all of recorded history prior to annexation, including all census counts made during the Kingdom of Hawaii, the number of Native Hawaiians in Hawaii declined.  The lowest recorded number of Native Hawaiians in Hawaii was 37,656 in the first census conducted by the United States in 1900 after the annexation of Hawaii to the United States in 1898.  Since Hawaii has joined the United States the Native Hawaiian population in Hawaii has increased with every census to 289,970 in 2010. 

For many Native Hawaiians, the manner in which Hawaii became a U.S. territory was illegal.  However, many Hawaiians are also proud to be Hawaiians and Americans and believe the manner in which Hawaii became a U.S. State was legal.  Hawaii Territory governors and judges were direct political appointees of the U.S. President. Native Hawaiians created the Home Rule Party to seek greater self-government. The 1960s Hawaiian Renaissance led to renewed interest in the Hawaiian language, culture and identity.

With the support of Hawaii Senators Daniel Inouye and Daniel Akaka, Congress passed a joint resolution called the "Apology Resolution" (US Public Law 103-150). It was signed by President Bill Clinton on November 23, 1993. This resolution apologized "to Native Hawaiians on behalf of the people of the United States for the overthrow of the Kingdom of Hawaii on January 17, 1893... and the deprivation of the rights of Native Hawaiians to self-determination." The implications of this resolution have been extensively debated.  The resolution's description of the history of Hawaii is also selective and inflammatory and has been thoroughly criticized, ignoring entirely, for example, the fact that the overthrow of the Hawaiian Kingdom was led by Hawaiian citizens on the Committee of Safety.  The resolution also fails to explain why it would only apply to Native Hawaiians as defined as people descended from persons living in Hawaii prior to Captain Cook's arrival in 1778, as opposed to all subjects of the Kingdom, since in theory all subjects would have been the victims of the overthrow because citizenship in the Kingdom was not limited to persons descended from people living in Hawaii prior to 1778.

In 2000, Akaka proposed what was called the Akaka Bill to extend federal recognition to those of Native Hawaiian ancestry as a sovereign group similar to Native American tribes. The bill did not pass before his retirement.

See also

 Women's suffrage in Hawaii
Legal status of Hawaii
 List of conflicts in Hawaii
 List of Missionaries to Hawaii
 National Register of Historic Places listings in Hawaii
 Timeline of Honolulu

References

Bibliography
 Beechert, Edward D. Working in Hawaii: A labor history (University of Hawaii Press, 1985).
 Craig, Robert D. Historical dictionary of Honolulu and Hawaiʻi (Scarecrow Press, 1998).
 
 Fuchs, Lawrence H. Hawaii Pono: 'Hawaii the Excellent': An Ethnic and Political History. (1961).
 Haley, James L. Captive Paradise: A History of Hawaii (St. Martin's Press, 2014).
 Kuykendall, Ralph Simpson, and Arthur Grove Day. Hawaii: a history, from Polynesian kingdom to American state (Prentice Hall, 1961) also online 1926 edition.
 La Croix, Sumner.  Hawai’i: Eight Hundred Years of Political and Economic Change (U of Chicago Press, 2019) 309 pp.  EH.net online review by Lee J. Alston
 La Croix, Sumner. "Economic history of Hawai‘i." Oxford Research Encyclopedia of Economics and Finance (2021)
 Tabrah, Ruth M. Hawaii: a history (WW Norton & Company, 1984).
 Wyndette, Olive. Islands of Destiny: A History of Hawaii (1968).

 Specialty studies
 Aquino, Belinda. The Filipino Century in Hawaii: Out of the Crucible (2006).
 Brown, DeSoto and Anne Ellett. Hawaii goes to war: life in Hawaii from Pearl Harbor to peace (1989).
 Chapin, Helen. Shaping history: The role of newspapers in Hawai'i (University of Hawaii Press, 1996).
 Cochran, Thomas C. and Ray Ginger. "The American-Hawaiian Steamship Company, 1899–1919," Business History Review (1954). 28#4, pp. 342–365.
 Forbes, David W. Encounters with paradise: views of Hawaii and its people, 1778–1941 (Honolulu Academy of Arts, 1992).
 Greenlee, John Wyatt. "Eight Islands on Four Maps: The Cartographic Renegotiation of Hawai'i, 1876-1959." Cartographica 50, 3 (2015), 119–140. online

 MacLennan, Carol A. Sovereign Sugar, Industry and Environment in Hawaii (2014). 
 Mak, James. "Creating 'Paradise of the Pacific': How Tourism Began in Hawaii." (No. 2015-1. 2015) online. 82pp
 Melendy, Howard Brett, and Rhoda E.A. Hackler. Hawaii, America's Sugar Territory, 1898–1959 (Lewiston, New York: Edwin Mellen Press, 1999).
 Melendy, Howard Brett. Walter Francis Dillingham, 1875–1963: Hawaiian Entrepreneur and Statesman (Lewiston, New York: Edwin Mellen Press, 1996).
 Morgan, William Michael. "The Anti-Japanese Origins of the Hawaiian Annexation Treaty Of 1897" Diplomatic History. (1982) 6#1 pp 23-44.
 Morgan, William Michael.  Pacific Gibraltar: U.S.-Japanese Rivalry Over the Annexation of Hawaii, 1885-1898 (Naval Institute Press, 2011).  See  online review by Kenneth R. Conklin, PhD
 

 Rohrer, Judy. Haoles in Hawai'i (2010), 124ff.; scholarly survey
 Russ, William Adam. The Hawaiian Revolution (1893-94) (1992)
 Russ, William Adam. The Hawaiian Republic (1894–98) and its struggle to win annexation (Susquehanna U Press, 1992).

 Schmitt, Robert C. Historical Statistics of Hawaii (University Press of Hawaii, 1977). 
 Schmitt, Robert C. "Religious statistics of Hawaii, 1825-1972."  Hawaiian Journal of History (1973), Vol. 7, pp 41-47.
 Schmitt, Robert C. Demographic Statistics of Hawaii." Demographic Statistics of Hawaii (University of Hawaii Press, 2021).
 Siler, Julia Flynn. Lost Kingdom: Hawaii's Last Queen, the Sugar Kings and America's First Imperial Adventure (2012).
 Sumida, Stephen H. And the View from the Shore: Literary Traditions of Hawai'i (University of Washington Press, 2015).
 Teodoro, Luis V., ed. Out of this struggle: The Filipinos in Hawaii (U. University of Hawaii Press, 2019).
 Tregaskis, Richard. The warrior king: Hawaii's Kamehameha the Great (1973).
 

 Wilson, Rob. "Exporting Christian Transcendentalism, Importing Hawaiian Sugar: The Trans-Americanization of Hawai'i." American Literature 72#.3 (2000): 521–552. online

External links
 Audio of Dwight D. Eisenhower Hawaii Statehood Proclamation Speech
 Public Law 103-150
 Scots in Hawai`i
 How Spain Cast Its Spell On Hawai'i, by Chris Cook in The Islander Magazine History of Hawaii: The Pokiki: Portuguese Traditions in The Islander Magazine''
 Today in Hawai`i History